SINIX is a discontinued variant of the Unix operating system from Siemens Nixdorf Informationssysteme. SINIX supersedes SIRM OS and Pyramid Technology's DC/OSx. Following X/Open's acceptance that its requirements for the use of the UNIX trademark were met, version 5.44 and subsequent releases were published as Reliant UNIX by Fujitsu Siemens Computers.

Features
In some versions of SINIX (5.2x) the user could emulate the behaviour of a number of different versions of Unix (known as universes). These included System V.3, System III or BSD. Each universe had its own command set, libraries and header files.

Xenix-based SINIX
The original SINIX was a modified version of Xenix and ran on Intel 80186 processors. For some years Siemens used the NSC-32x32 (up to Sinix 5.2x) and Intel 80486 CPUs (Sinix 5.4x - non MIPS) in their MX-Series.

System V-based SINIX
Later versions of SINIX based on System V were designed for the:
 SNI RM-200, RM-300, RM-400 and RM-600 servers running on the MIPS processor (SINIX-N, SINIX-O, SINIX-P, SINIX-Y)
 SNI PC-MX2, MX300-05/-10/-15/-30, Siemens MX500-75/-85 running NS320xx (SINIX-H)
 PC-MXi, MX300-45 on the Intel X86 processor (SINIX-L)
 SNI WX-200 and other IBM-compatible i386 PCs on the Intel 80386 and newer processors (SINIX-Z)

The last release under the SINIX name was version 5.43 in 1995.

Reliant UNIX
The last Reliant UNIX versions were registered as UNIX 95 compliant (XPG4 hard branding).

The last release of Reliant UNIX was version 5.45.

See also
 BS2000
 VM2000

External links
 Siemens Business Services - SINIX patches and support
 The SINIX operating system
 Sven Mascheck, SINIX V5.20 Universes

MIPS operating systems
UNIX System V